The Unguided is a Swedish melodic death metal band, founded by Richard Sjunnesson, Roger Sjunnesson, Roland Johansson and John Bengtsson, all of whom are former members of Sonic Syndicate. Later, they were joined by Cipher System bassist Henric Liljesand. Bengtsson was replaced by Richard Schill in late 2012 and Johansson was replaced by Jonathan Thorpenberg in 2016.

History

Formation (2009-2010)
Before The Unguided was formed, all of the core members played in the Swedish metal band Sonic Syndicate. Vocalist Roland Johansson left in 2009 due to issues with extensive touring. In October 2010, it was announced that vocalist Richard Sjunneson would not take part of the rest of the We Rule the Night tour to spend more time with his family, but a couple of days after he announced the break was permanent, that he left Sonic Syndicate due to creative differences. Richard went on to form the new band, The Unguided, together with Roland Johansson and Roger Sjunnesson.

Nightmareland (2010-2011)
On December 22, 2010, Richard revealed on his blog that the band would be releasing two brand-new songs in January.  On January 9, 2011 the band revealed the artwork and title for their upcoming EP, Nightmareland. The artwork  was done by Kuang Hong. The layout and booklet design was made by Gustavo Sazes, the same person who made the artwork for the Sonic Syndicate EP Burn This City. An alternative version of the artwork for later re-issues of the EP was made by Jose A. Aranguren, the same person who made the artwork for the Sonic Syndicate album Eden Fire. On the same day, it was also announced that the release date of Nightmareland would be delayed until February due to the band re-recording it in a professional studio and not in Richard's home studio. On January 18, 2011, the band announced the title of the two new songs for the Nightmareland EP: "Green Eyed Demon" and "Pathfinder". On the same day, it was revealed that the recording took place in The Abyss studio (same studio Sonic Syndicate recorded Only Inhuman, Love and Other Disasters and Burn This City) in Pärlby, Sweden with producer Jonas Kjellgren (same producer Sonic Syndicate used for Only Inhuman, Love and Other Disasters and Burn This City).

On February 6, 2011, the band announced that their first concert would be as a part of the set-list for the 2011 Getaway Rock Festival. Richard also revealed that he had joined the Swedish metal band Faithful Darkness.

On February 16, 2011, the band released a video on their YouTube page including a preview of two tracks of the upcoming EP. On February 18, 2011, the band announced that the recording, mixing and mastering of Nightmareland was done. They also announced that the band had signed with the Swedish record label Despotz Records, on which Nightmareland would be released. March 7, 2011 the band announced that Nightmareland would be released on April 1, 2011 through Despotz Records. They also announced that the band would be re-recording songs they wrote when they still were in Fallen Angels. On the release day of Nightmareland, "Pathfinder" premiered on the Swedish radio station Bandit Rock.

Hell Frost (2011-2012)
On April 28, 2011, the band announced that pre-production of their debut album had officially begun. They also revealed that Jonas Kjellgren also would be producing the album and that The Unguided had signed a deal with Despotz Records to release and distribute it. On June 6, 2011 it was revealed that the second The Unguided concert would be on July 26, 2011 at the annual Grand Rock event at their hometown Falkenberg, Sweden.

Richard had already hinted that fans needed to keep their eyes out for June 16, 2011 without revealing anything more than that it would be a special day. On June 16, 2011, without any official announcement, The Unguided released their debut single "Betrayer of the Code". "Betrayer of the Code" was originally written by Roger and Richard when they still played in Fallen Angels. The artwork for the single was made by Jose A. Aranguren, the same person who made the artwork for the Sonic Syndicate album Eden Fire and the alternative version of Nightmareland. With the release of the first single, The Unguided had officially begun recording their debut album. Although the recording session had already been going on for a while, it wasn't announced until June 16.

On June 25, 2011, Richard announced that The Unguided would not be able to perform any songs from Sonic Syndicate due to contractual reasons. After Johansson departed the band in 2009 he signed a contract which prohibits him from playing Sonic Syndicate material (signing this contract was mistakenly assumed mandatory). A counter-contract signed by the other band members was required to lift the restriction but Robin Sjunnesson (cousin of Richard & Roger) refused to sign it, removing all possibility for The Unguided to play Sonic Syndicate material.

Richard Sjunnesson included the following statement about the situation on his blog:

On October 3, the artwork and title of their debut album Hell Frost was revealed at 616. The artwork was done by Kuang Hong, the same person who made the artwork for Nightmareland. The layout and booklet design was made by Gustavo Sazes. On the same day Despotz Records announced that the recording, mixing and mastering of Hell Frost. was completed and that it would be released on November 30, 2011.

Richard had already announced on his blog that the album would include a cover song; on October 8, it was revealed to be "Tankens Mirakel" by the Swedish EBM duo Spark. The song has been translated into English and will appear on the album with the title "The Miracle of Mind". It will be the JakeBox exclusive bonus track for Hell Frost. On October 11 the Swedish radio station Bandit Rock premiered the song "Inherit the Earth", a preview of the song had been played the day before as well.

On October 25, it was announced that "Inherit the Earth" would be the lead single. "Phoenix Down" was originally intended as the lead single. The single was eventually released on October 26, 2011. The artwork for the single was made by Jose A. Aranguren. On January 13, 2012 the band released their second single "Phoenix Down" and its music video, directed by Patric Ullaeus who has worked with all the members of the band on several occasions. The single was released as a 4-track single. The artwork for the single was made by Jose A. Aranguren.

InvaZion and Fragile Immortality (2012-2015)
On December 21, 2012, The Unguided independently released the two-track EP InvaZion, featuring the tracks "Singularity" and "Eye of the Thylacine.". The release dates for Fragile Immortality were announced on November 21, 2013: January 31, 2014 in Germany, Austria, Switzerland, Finland, and Benelux; February 5 in Spain, Sweden, and Norway; February 3 for the "rest of Europe"; and February 11 for the U.S. and Canada. The new album was announced to be recorded with Napalm Records.

Fragile Immortality takes on old Sonic Syndicate lyrical themes, such as the tracks "Unguided Entity" and "Only Human."

Lust and Loathing; Roland Johansson's Departure and New Member (2015-present)
Between October 30, 2015 and November 27, 2015, The Unguided posted a three-part series of studio vlogs detailing the band's work on an upcoming album. On December 3, 2015, The Unguided officially announced the details of their upcoming album, which is to be titled "Lust and Loathing." The release date is scheduled for February 26, 2016 via Napalm Records, and pre-orders will be shipped out on week 8 of year 2016. Multiple pre-order bundles for Europe include combinations of the album, T-shirt, sleeved shirt, poster, guitar pick, and 2016 calendar. Two available pre-orders for U.S. are either the Digipack Limited Edition CD or the T-shirt - no bundles are available. After announcing the album, Richard Sjunnesson, the band's harsh vocalist, commented: "Sitting on the new songs, for what felt like a lifetime, and finally get to shed some light on what’s to come from camp; The Unguided, is a sensation on its own. This is the last part of an album trilogy, that’s been in the making for 6 years, and what a climax it is indeed. Expect the unexpected! We poured everything and more into this one." An article on BraveWords website reports that tour dates to support the new album will be announced soon.

Following recent shows without co-frontman and guitarist Roland Johansson, the band posted a new music video on YouTube titled Nighttaker which briefly showed Johansson but also a new vocalist, Jonathan Thorpenberg. The following day on December 10, 2016, the band released an official statement on Social media, announcing the departure of Roland Johansson who had been a member since the band's formation six years ago. He left because of increasingly growing commitments to touring and recording, which were having a negative impact on his personal life.

Band members

Current members
 Richard Sjunnesson – scream vocals (2010–present)
 Jonathan Thorpenberg - clean vocals, lead guitar (2016–present)
 Roger Sjunnesson – rhythm guitar, keyboards (2010–present)
 Richard Schill – drums (2012–present)

Former members
 John Bengtsson – drums (2011–2012)
 Roland Johansson – lead guitar, clean vocals  (2010–2016)
 Henric Liljesand – bass (2011–2020)

Session musicians
Pontus Hjelm – keyboard production (2011-present)
Christoffer Andersson – live guest vocals (2011)
Jonas Kjellgren – Hell Frost bass (2011)
Per Qvarnström – live drums (2011)
Peter Tägtgren – Hell Frost guest vocals  (2011)
Hansi Kürsch – Fragile Immortality guest vocals  (2014)
 Jonas Vilander - live bass through the Lust and Loathing Tour (2016)

 Timeline

Gallery

Discography

Studio albums

Compilations

Extended plays

Singles

Music videos

References

External links
 Official website

Musical groups established in 2010
Swedish melodic death metal musical groups
Alternative metal musical groups
Power metal musical groups
Metalcore musical groups
2010 establishments in Sweden